The 1945 North Dakota Fighting Sioux football team, also known as the Nodaks, was an American football team that represented the University of North Dakota in the North Central Conference (NCC) during the 1945 college football season. In its 14th year under head coach Charles A. West, the team compiled a 1–2 record (1–1 against NCC opponents) and was outscored by a total of 59 to 43.  The team opened its season with a 21–16 loss to the Winnipeg Blue Bombers, a professional football team from Canada.

Schedule

References

North Dakota
North Dakota Fighting Hawks football seasons
North Dakota Fighting Sioux football